Mihály Huszka (2 June 1933 – 9 December 2022) was a Hungarian weightlifter. He competed at the 1960 Summer Olympics and the 1964 Summer Olympics.

Huszka died on 9 December 2022, at the age of 89.

References

External links
 

1933 births
2022 deaths
Hungarian male weightlifters
Olympic weightlifters of Hungary
Weightlifters at the 1960 Summer Olympics
Weightlifters at the 1964 Summer Olympics
People from Csongrád
World Weightlifting Championships medalists
Sportspeople from Csongrád-Csanád County
20th-century Hungarian people